A number of naval trawlers of the Royal Navy were named Agate:

 , sunk in 1918 by SM UC-71
 , ran aground and sank in 1941

Royal Navy ship names